The following is a list of Dancing on Ice contestants to date along with their age at the time of competing, professional partners, competition finish, number of dances, highest and lowest scores, total scores and average scores.

The scores and their averages do not include any dances that were not scored on the same scale, such as the duel. The dances were scored out of 30.0 from series 1 to 7 and out of 40.0 from series 8 onwards, therefore the average scores will reflect this.

List of contestants
Key:
 Winner of the series
 Runner-up of the series
 Third place of the series
 Last place of the series
 Withdrew
 Participating in the current series
 Contestant has died since participating

References

Dancing on Ice
Contestants
Dancing on Ice contestants